Talang-e Saratak (also Romanized as Talang-e Sarātaḵ) is a village in Karian Rural District, in the Central District of Minab County, Hormozgan Province, Iran. At the 2006 census, its population was 602, in 127 families.

References 

Populated places in Minab County